Three Smart Guys is a 1943 Our Gang short comedy film directed by Edward Cahn. It was the 217th Our Gang short released (218th episode, 129th talking short, 130th talking episode, and 49th MGM produced episode).

Plot
Mickey, Froggy and Buckwheat devise a scheme to play hooky from school and go fishing. They misbehave in class in hopes that the teacher will expel them but instead are forced to stay after school. The next morning they decide to just play hooky and go fishing, but upon arriving at the river bank, the kids make the acquaintance of a friendly hobo (Edward Fielding), who advises them that they will never hook the "fish" of success unless they return to school. Duly chastened, the boys rush off to the schoolhouse just in time for the first bell.

Cast

The Gang
 Bobby Blake as Mickey
 Billy Laughlin as Froggy
 Billie Thomas as Buckwheat
 Janet Burston as Janet

Additional cast
 Edward Fielding as The wise fisherman
 Marta Linden as Miss Pillsbury, teacher
 Marlene Kisker as Classroom extra
 Eleanor Taylor as Classroom extra

Production notes
Plot devices for Three Smart Guys were borrowed from 1932's Readin' and Writin'.

Edward Cahn returned to direct this entry. Cyril Endfield then assumed directorial duties until production on the series ceased the following year.

See also
 Our Gang filmography

References

External links

1943 films
American black-and-white films
Films directed by Edward L. Cahn
Metro-Goldwyn-Mayer short films
1943 comedy films
Our Gang films
1943 short films
1940s American films